Sophie Karmasin (born 5 January 1967) is an opinion researcher who was Minister for Families and Youth of Austria for four years.

Karmasin was born in Vienna. She studied business administration and later psychology at the University of Salzburg. She led the family-owned , a market research company founded by her parents, until entering politics. Karmasin is married with two children.

She was appointed to the second Faymann government in December 2013. She was nominated for the office by the Austrian People's Party (ÖVP), but does not have a party membership. She worked on increasing family benefits and improving day care capacity but was criticised for her lack of experience in politics.

Karmasin left politics after the 2017 Austrian legislative election. In 2018 she founded a consulting firm. Since 2019 she presents an opinion poll segment on television channel .

In 2021, Karmasin was one of ten people accused of bribery and embezzlement in the Kurz corruption probe. Investigators allege that she acted as an intermediary between the ÖVP and the founders of Österreich, a newspaper that published manipulated opinion polls. , a former assistant of Karmasin, was arrested on 12 October. Karmasin herself was arrested on the 3rd of March due to critical risk of committing a crime and collusion.

References

External links 
 

1967 births
Living people
Politicians from Vienna
University of Salzburg alumni
Government ministers of Austria
Women government ministers of Austria
21st-century Austrian politicians
21st-century Austrian women politicians